Following the establishment of the Irish Free State, three deep water Treaty Ports at Berehaven, Spike Island (off modern Cóbh), and Lough Swilly were retained by the United Kingdom in accordance with the Anglo-Irish Treaty of 6 December 1921. 

The main reason for the retention of the ports was the U-boat Campaign around Irish coasts during World War I and the concern of the British government that it might recur. As a part of the overall Anglo-Irish settlement, all other Royal Navy, British Army and RAF personnel and equipment were to evacuate the Free State.

As part of the settlement of the Anglo-Irish Trade War in the 1930s, the ports were transferred to Ireland (the Free State's successor) in 1938 following agreements reached between the British and Irish governments.

Terms of the treaty
In 1921, Éamon de Valera originally offered – in an early version of the Anglo-Irish Treaty – to allow the British to continue to use the ports for a further period of five years. The British would also be able to use whatever harbours they required in wartime.

However, Article 8 was defeated by republicans within de Valera's own party and removed from the final terms of the treaty. Instead, the issue of the ports was addressed in Article 7:

The Annex referred to in that Article read as follows:

The Annex included reference to Belfast Lough because Northern Ireland was included within the original territory of the Irish Free State, although under the Treaty it had the right to opt out of the Free State and back into the UK. It did so on 8 December 1922. With the departure of Northern Ireland from the Free State, this left three United Kingdom bases in the territory of the Free State (subsequently renamed "Ireland" in the 1937 Constitution).  The continued occupation by the United Kingdom of these bases was increasingly irksome, because Irish foreign policy had moved from a position of wanting some Royal Navy protection in 1922 to being a champion for neutrality in the 1930s at the League of Nations.

Notably, the position of the Treaty Ports was raised by de Valera in correspondence with the British government in 1932 shortly before the beginning of the Economic War, where he noted:

Agreement on transfer of Treaty Ports
From 1932 until 1938, the governments of the former Irish Free State and the United Kingdom had been involved in a long-running Anglo-Irish Trade War that was not in the interest of either state's economy. In September 1937 Malcolm MacDonald made it clear to de Valera that the United Kingdom was prepared to give up the ports if the Irish gave a guarantee that the British could use them in times of war. Under pressure to ease the burden of the Trade War, in November 1937 de Valera proposed talks between the two governments. Shortly afterwards, the Irish Situation Committee chaired by Prime Minister Neville Chamberlain recommended a potential package deal for Ireland that would include returning the ports subject to the agreement of the chiefs of staff. Chamberlain had come to the view that it was worth surrendering the treaty ports unconditionally "to obtain the essential goodwill of the Irish Free State". Negotiations to settle the matters in dispute took place in 1938. The Anglo-Irish Trade Agreement was signed on 25 April 1938; the section relating to the Treaty Ports was as follows:

The Agreement was subject to parliamentary approval by both parties. The United Kingdom subsequently enacted the Eire (Confirmation of Agreements) Act 1938, which put in effect, among other things, the British government's agreement to transfer the Treaty Ports.

Spike Island Handover (11 July 1938)
On 12 July 1938, The Times (London) reported on the handover of Spike Island, near Cobh on 11 July 1938 as follows:

The invitations to the Irish handover celebration read as follows:

Berehaven handover (29 September 1938)
On 1 October 1938, The Times reported the handover of forts and batteries (known collectively as Berehaven) around Castletownbere and on Bere Island on 29 September 1938 as follows:

The Times''' choice of headline was a little misleading in one respect: the British troops at Berehaven were not the last troops to leave the Irish state. The evacuation of Lough Swilly was yet to take place.

Lough Swilly handover (3 October 1938)
On 4 October 1938, The Times reported on the handover of Lough Swilly at Fort Dunree in County Donegal on 3 October 1938 as follows:

British dissent 
Following the agreement to handover the Treaty Ports to the Irish Free State, Winston Churchill was one of only a few MPs who were critical of the decision. In 1938 he addressed the UK's House of Commons calling it a "folly":

Churchill also remarked that the concessions under the Agreements of 1938 were "astonishing triumphs" for Irish leader Éamon de Valera. Churchill also asked would it not be "far better to give up the £10,000,000 [a one-off Irish payment under the Agreement], and acquire the legal right, be it only on a lease granted by treaty, to use these harbours when necessary?" Mr Churchill also made a remark concerning the name by which the Irish state would henceforth be described in the UK (Eire) – "I have not been able to form a clear opinion on the exact juridical position of the Government of that portion of Ireland called Southern Ireland, which is now called Eire. That is a word which really has no application at the present time, and I must say, even from the point of view of the ordinary uses of English, that it is not customary to quote a term in a foreign language, a capital town, a geographical place, when there exists a perfectly well-known English equivalent [Ireland]. It is usual to say Paris not Paree."

With the outbreak of the Second World War in September 1939, Churchill's concerns proved justified. The escort groups' refuelling facilities at Berehaven and Queenstown were  further west than the nearest ones in Northern Ireland and Great Britain. To compensate for the distance, allied convoys from North America had to be routed via Iceland to the ports in Northern Ireland in the early months of the Battle of the Atlantic. However, this decision arguably proved more practical because the shorter sea lanes around Ireland's southern coast soon became vulnerable to German anti-shipping air attacks following the Fall of France in June 1940. The Iceland route also provided adequate air cover and escort refuelling for allied convoys. Nevertheless, many in the Royal Navy felt resentment towards the handover of the Irish Treaty Ports because they would have provided cover to convoys heading south to Gibraltar and North Africa.

Formerly, when the country was part of the United Kingdom of Great Britain and Ireland, the Royal Navy had designated its Ireland Station'' as a long-standing separate command.

See also
 Statement relating to Defence (UK White Paper, 1935, initiating rearmament).
 Irish neutrality during World War II
The Emergency
 Donegal Corridor
 Irish Naval Service
 Plan W
 Akrotiri and Dhekelia

Footnotes

References

External links
 British-Irish tripartite agreement on Trade, Finance and Defence, 1938
 Anglo-Irish Treaty, 1921 

Irish Free State
Ireland and the Commonwealth of Nations
Former exclaves